Forrest David Walton McKenzie (born February 16, 1963) is an American former professional basketball player. He played in six National Basketball Association games.

References 

1963 births
Living people
American expatriate basketball people in France
American expatriate basketball people in Israel
American expatriate basketball people in Portugal
American men's basketball players
Basketball players from Pasadena, California
Basketball players from Camden, New Jersey
Loyola Marymount Lions men's basketball players
Pasadena High School (California) alumni
San Antonio Spurs draft picks
San Antonio Spurs players
Small forwards